Dehsur or Deh Sur or Deh Soor may refer to:
 Dehsur-e Olya
 Dehsur-e Sofla